GIIS is an abbreviation for:

 Global Indian International School Singapore 
 Graduate Institute of Development Studies, absorbed in 2008 into the Graduate Institute of International and Development Studies or Institut de hautes études internationales et du développement, in Geneva, Switzerland